East–West Highway ( or ,) or also known as Gerik–Jeli Highway (Phase 1), Kulim–Baling Highway and Titi Karangan–Gerik Highway (both are part of Phase 2), Federal Route 4, Asian Highway Route 140 is the  federal highway constructed by the Malaysian Public Works Department (JKR) to shorten the journey from Kota Bharu, Kelantan to northwestern towns and cities of Malaysia such as Alor Star, Kedah and Penang. The highway connects Gerik, Perak in the west to Jeli, Kelantan in the east, before being extended further to Lunas, Kedah.

Overview
The East–West Highway FT4 was opened to traffic on 1 July 1982. The construction of the highway was one of the largest projects undertaken by the JKR and its completion adds to the large mileage of roads in the country providing necessary access to new areas and the infrastructure for development works. The construction of the first phase of the highway was carried out by JKR workers, while the bridges and some of the ancillary works were carried out through contractors; during the second phase, the entire construction job was done by contractors.

The highway includes Lake Temenggor Bridge which crosses Lake Temenggor, a hydroelectric dam and Pulau Banding, an artificial island.

The East–West Highway is one of the more scenic routes in Peninsular Malaysia, due to its hilly nature. The highway passes through two major mountain ranges, namely the Bintang Range and the Titiwangsa Range. As one enters the highway, the Titiwangsa Range through which the highway traverses comes into view in the distant. Traveling along the gentle curves one climbs higher and sees on either side the primary jungle rich with timber. As one proceeds, the jungle gives way to the huge artificial Lake Temenggor at Banding. There are places where road signs are put up to warn motorists of elephants crossing the road, as there is no dedicated grade-separated animal crossing provided.

While the highway was constructed as an entirely new route (except the former Perak State Route A171 section from Gerik to Kuala Rui that formed the pioneer route of the highway), the construction of the second phase involved acquisitions of several roads, namely Kedah State Route K171 (Kampung Sadek–Kampung Hangus), Kedah State Route K173 (Kampung Hangus–Kampung Kuala Kuang), Jalan Kampung Keda Kemangi (Kampung Kuala Kuang–Kampung Keda Kemangi), and Jalan Sungai Petani–Baling FT67 (Kupang–Kuala Pegang and Kuala Pegang–Tawar). As a result, the East–West Highway FT4 overlaps with Kedah State Route K171 (from Kampung Sadek to Kampung Hangus) and Jalan Sungai Petani–Baling FT67.

As the section of the highway from Kulim to Kupang was constructed back to back with the Butterworth–Kulim Expressway E15 and overlaps with the FT67 road, some maps incorrectly label the highway as either FT67 or E15. However, both route codes are incorrect, as the Sungai Seluang–Tawar section is not an expressway-standard road. The FT4 route code was only applied after the final section from Titi Karangan to Gerik was completed in 2005.

The completion of the highway will reduce transport costs and with this the state of Kelantan can expect its tempo of development to be heightened, new towns and industrial areas will be developed. The highway will provide the access for the extraction of timber from the jungles along the road and help boost tourism among Malaysians as well as foreigners.

Thr highway is one of dangerous routes in malaysia due to condition of roads causing many record of traffic collision and natural disaster.

History

Phase 1 (Gerik–Jeli, 1970–1982)
The construction of the East–West Highway FT4 was proposed by then first Malaysian Prime Minister, Tunku Abdul Rahman Putra Al-Haj in 1964. The highway was initially planned to be built from Sungai Siput, Perak to Kuala Berang, Terengganu before being changed to the present-day routing from Gerik to Jeli. The original plan was later being revived as the Second East–West Highway FT185, but with a slightly different western terminus at Simpang Pulai.

The construction of the East–West Highway FT4 began in the 1970 as a defence-related highway during the Communist insurgency in Malaysia (1968–89). The Malaysian Government, then, introduced a new strategy of fighting the Communist Party of Malaya (CPM). It was known as Security and Development, or KESBAN, the local acronym (Program Keselamatan dan Pembangunan), and focused on civil military affairs. Under KESBAN, the government made large efforts to develop rural areas with the implementation of massive development programs such as building roads, schools, hospitals, medical clinics, and public utilities like electricity and water supply.

In October 1969, the JKR was instructed to commence work on the Highway with immediate effect. In early 1970, work started, simultaneously from Gerik and Jeli even before any detailed design or investigations were carried out. Existing earth moving machines from the various states were deployed until new machines for the project were purchased. It was only in early 1973 that the full complement of machines and staff were available for the project to proceed. In the early stages, there was military presence in every kilometre. The road was built to cut off the Communist terrorist from the safe havens in Thailand.

Two base camps were constructed, one at the Gerik end and the other at the Jeli end. The whole construction staff and their families were housed at these camps. A pilot track was constructed to gain access to the forward areas. This was followed by jungle clearing work by the main earthworks teams. As work progressed and travel time between the work site and base camp increased, forward camps were set up to house the workers.

During construction, the highway was sabotaged and ambushed by the communist terrorists during the Communist insurgency from 1970 to 1982. Many of workers were killed and the bulldozers was seriously damaged. The worst incidents happened in two separate attacks by the communist terrorists 1974, resulting 3 deaths among the JKR workers and many construction machines were destroyed. The East–West Highway was put under strict security control by the Territorial Army Regiment of the Malaysian Army during construction and during the opening of the Highway on 1 July 1982. This military operation during construction of the Highway known as "Ops Pagar" (Operation Barrier). Motorists were allowed to use the Highway at daytime only due to security reasons. The military control of the Highway was lifted after the insurgency war was ended in 1989.

The East–West Highway FT4 was officially opened to motorists on 1 July 1982. The successful completion of the East–West Highway is the result of the sacrifice of workers who had to carry out their jobs under difficult and challenging conditions.

Chronology
 26 April 1974 – Communist Party of Malaya (CPM) assault group attacked and destroyed the equipment used in building the East–West Highway, which delayed the completion of the project by two years.
 23 May 1974 –  Communist Party of Malaya (CPM) assault group attacked and destroyed the 63 bulldozers used in building the East–West Highway.
 27 August 1974 – Communist Party of Malaya (CPM) assault group launch an ambush at East–West Highway, killing three Malaysian Public Works Department (JKR) workers and several others wounded.
 15 August 1977 – Communist Party of Malaya (CPM) assault group launch an ambush at East–West Highway. Five soldiers from the 11th Battalion of the Askar Wataniah (Territorial Army) were ambushed by 30 Communist terrorist during left Post 8 for Post 5 on patrol and to obtain supplies.

Phase 2 (Kulim–Gerik, 1993–2005)
The East–West Highway FT4 was extended westwards as a part of the 1993 Malaysian Highway Network Development Plan, together with the construction of the Butterworth–Kulim Expressway E15. As a result, the end point of the highway at Sungai Seluang intersection forms the starting point of the Butterworth–Kulim Expressway. The Kulim–Baling section was constructed first, followed by the final section from Titi Karangan to Gerik, where the East–West Highway extension links with the original highway. Construction of the final section started in 2001 and was completed in 2005.

Memorials

Malaysian Public Works Department (JKR) East–West Highway Monument
The Malaysian Public Works Department (JKR) East–West Highway Monument was erected at a site near Sri Banding Army Camp on 1 July 1982, where a raid by the communist terrorists that killed three JKR workers and injured some other workers, to commemorate those who died during construction of the East–West Highway with lake bridge. The plaques reads "Pengorbanan Dalam Kenangan, Jalan Raya Timur Barat (1970–1982)" ("The Greatest Sacrifice, East West Highway (1970–1982)"). In 2014, a reunion ceremony was held by JKR of Perak at the East–West Highway Monument to gather all former JKR workers that were involved during the construction of the highway.

In 2015, this monument was refurbished and later it was officially reopened on 2 July 2015 by the Works Minister, Datuk Seri Fadillah Yusof in conjunction of the highway's 33rd anniversary.

The inscription is written in Malay. The English version is reproduced below:

 

The East West Highway (Gerik–Jeli) was opened to traffic on 1st July 1982. Many lives have been lost during the construction which was implemented in 1970. Some people have died during work accidents and some people were attacked by communist terrorists.

At this location, about 63 bulldozers were blown up by the communist terrorists on 23 May 1974. At this location also three JKR workers were killed and several others wounded in an ambush on 27th August 1974. Several other attacks have occurred along the highway involving the JKR workers and security forces. We commemorate those who have sacrifice their lives for the construction of the East West Highway.

Please recite AL-FATIHAH* for those who lost their lives here.

Note: The word "AL-FATIHAH" is the first chapter of the Qur'an in Islam.

East–West Highway Memorial Gallery Banding
The East–West Highway Memorial Gallery Banding or Galeri Banding: Memori Lebuhraya Timur–Barat in Malay is a memorial gallery about the history of the construction of the East–West Highway. The gallery is set up at the former Malaysian Army military sentry bunker and situated near Belum Rainforest Resort and west side of Lake Temenggor Bridge at Pulau Banding. It was officially opened on 9 May 2014 by the sixth Malaysian Prime Minister, Najib Tun Razak. Many historical artifacts during Communist insurgency in Malaysia (1968–89) are exhibited here such as military bunkers, guard post replicas, weapons, uniforms and many more.

Malaysian Army Insurgency War Memorial
Other memorials include the Malaysian Army Insurgency War Memorial located at Dataran Juang in the Kem Tentera Darat Banding army camp not far from Lake Temenggor Bridge. This memorial was erected on 5 June 2009 to commemorate 116 soldiers who died during the communist insurgency from 1968 to 1989. The armoured vehicle at this memorial is a V-150 Commando armoured car of the Malaysian Army which was used during the insurgency.

Specifications
There are five major bridges along the Highway. Two of the bridges including the longest, the Lake Temenggor Bridge, span arms of the lake formed by the Temenggor Dam Project. The bridges were designed by ENEX of New Zealand under the Colombo Plan Aid. Construction of three of the bridges were undertaken by a foreign contractor while a joint venture between two local firms undertook the construction of the remaining two bridges. In addition to the above, there are about 280 culverts constructed mainly by departmental workers.

Constructing the highway was challenging for the JKR. There were many constraints, which slowed down progress. Some 27.5 million cubic metres of earth was required to be cut to construct the highway, of this over 3.8 million cubic metres was rock, which required drilling and blasting operations for its removal. The intensity of the monsoon rains especially in the forward areas reduced time available for construction to 10 months in a year. The East–West Highway is located close to the Malaysia–Thailand border and is situated in a Security Area. As a result, several measures had to be taken and procedures adopted to ensure the safety of the workers and the machines. These too contributed to some delay. The  highway, which links the East Coast at Jeli, Kelantan with the West Coast at Gerik, Perak cost RM 396 million. Other details of the project are as follows:

Major bridges span
 Sungai Rui Bridge: 256m
 Lake Temenggor Bridge (West side): 880 m
 Lake Temenggor Bridge (East side): 640 m
 Upper Sungai Pergau Bridge: 159 m
 Lower Sungai Pergau Bridge: 158 m

Road design criteria
 Design speed: 80 km/h
 Maximum Gradient: 7%
 Pavement Width: 7.2 m
 Shoulder Width: 2.3 m

Features
 There is one semi tunnel on the highway. It is probably the only one of its type in Malaysia.
 There are many military sentry bunkers along the highway especially at Lake Temenggor and Banding Island area.
 There are nine rest and service area along the highway. In Tawar, Sirabayas, Bintang Hijau, Perah (Gerik), Sungai Lebey, Pulau Banding, Air Banun, Titiwangsa ( above sea level) and Damai. 
 Elephant crossing on the road.
 Belum Eco Viaduct.

List of junctions and towns

Commemorative events

The East–West Highway commemorative postage stamps
The commemorative postage stamps to mark the opening of the East–West Highway on 1982 were issued by then the Malaysian Postal Services Department (now Pos Malaysia) on 1 July 1983, one year after the opening ceremony of the highway. The denominations for these stamps were 15 cents, 20 cents, and RM 1.00.

See also
 Second East–West Highway

References

Malaysian Federal Roads
Highways in Malaysia